Mib2 or variant, may refer to:

 Men in Black II (MIIB/MiB2) 2002 U.S. film
 Men in Black 2: The Series (videogame) 2002 GBC game
 Men in Black II: Alien Escape (videogame) 2002 PS2/GCN game
 MIB2 (gene), a gene encoding a ligase enzyme

See also
 MIB (disambiguation)
 MIBB (Michigan Israel Business Bridge)